Hans Nørgaard Andersen (born 3 November 1980, in Odense, Denmark) is a motorcycle speedway rider who captained the Denmark speedway team that won the Speedway World Cup in 2006 and 2008.

Career summary 
Andersen was a Danish Junior Champion in 1996 and reached the final of the 1999 Speedway Under-21 World Championship, where he finished fourth. He began his British league career when he joined Poole Pirates for the 2001 Elite League speedway season. He spent 2002 with Poole before securing a move to Peterborough Panthers in 2003.

During 2004 and 2005 he rode for Ipswich Witches and was an established member of the Danish national team as well as a regular rider in the Speedway Grand Prix. He won his first Grand Prix race during the 2004 Speedway Grand Prix, when he won the Speedway Grand Prix of Scandinavia. Despite being originally left out of the 2006 Speedway Grand Prix series, he replaced the retired Tony Rickardsson, eventually winning two Grand Prix meetings and finishing sixth in the final standings. He also became only the third rider to win a GP as a wild card.

In 2006, he returned to Peterborough and impressed by recording a 10 plus average in both 2006 and 2007 for them. He won his first World Cup gold medal for Denmark when the team won the 2006 Speedway World Cup.

In 2007, Andersen became Danish National Champion for the first time. Andersen left his British club, Peterborough Panthers, mid-season in July 2008 after it emerged that the club had not paid him wages amounting to several thousand pounds. Shortly afterwards he signed for Coventry Bees and teamed up with Chris Harris to win the Elite League Pairs Championship. he won his fourth and final Grand Prix race during the 2008 Speedway Grand Prix, when he won the Speedway Grand Prix of Italy. He also won his second World Cup with Denmark after winning the 2008 Speedway World Cup.

Andersen rode for the Poole Pirates in 2009, and moved on to join the Belle Vue Aces for the 2010 season. He returned to the Peterborough Panthers team towards the end of the 2011 season, replacing Nicki Pedersen.

Andersen led Swindon Robins to Elite League glory in 2012, and on 28 January he eventually was able to ride for the Wiltshire side again in 2013 following a winter-long battle with parent club Peterborough. In 2016, he signed for Poole Pirates, and he was with them again in 2017. He was with Leicester Lions in 2018 before riding with Peterborough in 2019.

In July 2021, Anderson re-signed for the Leicester Lions in the Championship. In 2022, he rode for Peterborough again, in the SGB Premiership 2022 and for the Plymouth Gladiators in the SGB Championship 2022 and signed again for Peterborough for the 2023 season.

Major results

World individual Championship
2002 Speedway Grand Prix - 30th - 1 pt
2003 Speedway Grand Prix - 17th - 41 pts
2004 Speedway Grand Prix - 9th - 80 pts including (Scandinavian) grand prix win
2005 Speedway Grand Prix - 12th - 64 pts
2006 Speedway Grand Prix - 6th - 101 pts including (Denmark, and Czech Republic) grand prix wins
2007 Speedway Grand Prix - 5th - 107 pts
2008 Speedway Grand Prix - 5th - 139 pts including (Italian) grand prix win
2009 Speedway Grand Prix - 10th - 91 pts
2010 Speedway Grand Prix - 12th -86 pts
2012 Speedway Grand Prix - 10th -69 pts

World team Championships
2002 Speedway World Cup - 2nd
2003 Speedway World Cup - 3rd
2004 Speedway World Cup - 3rd
2005 Speedway World Cup - 3rd
2006 Speedway World Cup - Winner
2007 Speedway World Cup - 2nd
2008 Speedway World Cup - Winner
2009 Speedway World Cup - 6th
2010 Speedway World Cup - 2nd
2011 Speedway World Cup - 
2013 Speedway World Cup - 
2014 Speedway World Cup - 
2016 Speedway World Cup -

Speedway Grand Prix results

See also 
 Denmark national speedway team
 List of Speedway Grand Prix riders

References 

1980 births
Living people
Danish speedway riders
Speedway World Cup champions
Belle Vue Aces riders
Coventry Bees riders
Ipswich Witches riders
Leicester Lions riders
Peterborough Panthers riders
Plymouth Gladiators speedway riders
Poole Pirates riders
Swindon Robins riders
Sportspeople from Odense